Alice Jessamy Macleod (born 14 May 1994) is an English cricketer who currently plays for Berkshire and Sunrisers. An all-rounder, she is a right-handed batter and right-arm off break bowler. She previously played for Southern Vipers and Western Storm in the Women's Cricket Super League and Welsh Fire in The Hundred.

Early life
Macleod was born on 14 May 1994 in Ascot, Berkshire.

Domestic career
Macleod made her county debut for in 2008, for Berkshire against Nottinghamshire. In 2010, she hit 61 in the Final of the Twenty20 Cup to help Berkshire to their first Twenty20 title. The following season, she achieved her T20 best bowling figures, taking 4/11 against Wales. In 2015, she hit her maiden county century, scoring 107 in a Championship match against Lancashire. In 2019, Macleod scored 249 runs at an average of 49.80 in the County Championship, as well as taking 12 wickets.

Macleod missed Berkshire's 2021 Women's Twenty20 Cup campaign due to work commitments, and subsequently went on loan to Essex for the Women's London Championship.

Macleod also played for Southern Vipers in the Women's Cricket Super League in 2016 and for Western Storm in 2017 and 2018. She therefore won two WCSL titles, one with Vipers in 2016 and one with Storm in 2017. Overall, she played 10 Super League matches, scoring 48 runs with a high score of 30, for Storm against Surrey Stars.

In 2020, Macleod played for Sunrisers in the Rachael Heyhoe Flint Trophy. She appeared in all six matches, scoring 68 runs and taking 4 wickets, with best bowling figures of 2/64 against Western Storm. In 2021, she was the side's second-highest run-scorer in the Rachael Heyhoe Flint Trophy, with 214 runs including 79 made against Southern Vipers. She also played for Welsh Fire in the inaugural season of The Hundred, appearing in five matches and scoring 33 runs. She played just one match in 2022, for Sunrisers in the Rachael Heyhoe Flint Trophy.

Macleod also played in the 2011 and 2012 Super Fours, for Diamonds and Emeralds, respectively.

References

External links

1994 births
Living people
People from Ascot, Berkshire
Berkshire women cricketers
Essex women cricketers
Southern Vipers cricketers
Western Storm cricketers
Sunrisers women's cricketers
Welsh Fire cricketers